Kerry Watkins (born May 16, 1979) is a former professional Canadian football wide receiver who spent his entire eight-year career with the Montreal Alouettes of the Canadian Football League. He was named a CFL East All-Star in 2005, 2006 and 2008, and a CFL All-Star in 2005. Watkins won Grey Cup championships in 2009 and 2010 with the Alouettes. He played college football for the Georgia Tech Yellow Jackets.

Professional career

New England Patriots
Following his college career, Watkins signed with the New England Patriots of the National Football League in May 2003. He was later released during the following August after spending training camp with the team.

Montreal Alouettes
Watkins signed with the Montreal Alouettes of the Canadian Football League in June 2004. He played in four of the first five games but missed the rest of the season due to a shoulder injury. In 2005, he recorded his first touchdown, his first 1,000-yard receiving season and his first CFL All-star selection. He was part of the 2005 Alouettes' foursome of 1,000-yard receivers, tying the record (set by the 2004 Alouettes receivers of Ben Cahoon with 1183 yards, Jeremaine Copeland with 1154 yards, Thyron Anderson with 1147 yards, and Kwame Cavil with 1090 yards) for most 1,000-yard receivers on one team in a season. Kerry Watkins' 1364 yards receiving on the 2005 Alouettes team combined with the performance of Watkins' fellow Alouette receivers Terry Vaughn (1113 yards), Ben Cahoon (1067 yards), and Dave Stala (1037 yards) making the 2005 Alouettes only the second team in CFL history to have four receivers on one team reaching the 1,000-yard receiving mark in one season.

Watkins' 2005 season was statistically his best, setting career highs in receptions (97), yardage (1,364) and longest reception (75 yards) while also scoring the second-most touchdowns in a season with nine. In 2008, Watkins scored ten touchdowns.

Watkins would go on to record five straight 1,000-yard seasons between 2005 and 2009 while falling just short in 2010 with 970 after he missed five games due to injury. He won Grey Cup championships with the Alouettes in 2009 and 2010, making a critical 17-yard catch in the 2009 game to put the Alouettes in field goal range to kick the winning points. His 2011 season was curtailed due to injury where he only managed to catch 31 passes for 395 yards and three touchdowns. Nonetheless, he finished the season in second place on the Alouettes all-time receptions list at 515 catches, behind all-time franchise and CFL leader Ben Cahoon. Following the 2011 season, Watkins announced his retirement on January 31, 2012.

Statistics

References

External links

KerryWatkins.com Official Website
Montreal Alouettes bio

1979 births
Living people
People from LaPlace, Louisiana
African-American players of Canadian football
American players of Canadian football
American football wide receivers
Canadian football wide receivers
Georgia Tech Yellow Jackets football players
Montreal Alouettes players
21st-century African-American sportspeople
20th-century African-American sportspeople